The Volvo Museum is in Gothenburg, Sweden. It covers the development of Sweden's leading vehicle manufacturer Volvo, from the first ÖV 4 to the current cars, trucks, buses and other products. The museum also has displays of Volvo Aero and Volvo Penta products, and many other exhibits, including the joint desk of Assar Gabrielsson and Gustaf Larson from the pioneering years of the company.

Visitor information 
Directly west of the museum one can take a nice walk along the Kattegat shore.
Cruise ships which are too tall to go under the Älvsborg Bridge ( allowed) berth nearby, which accounts for a fairly large share of visitors.

The museum is open daily except Mondays and public Swedish holidays.
Follow road 155 when driving.
The nearest bus stop is called Arendal Skans.
The Västtrafik web site can search and find connections.

Gallery

External links 

 Volvo Museum
 Volvo group site
 Volvo Museum Review, TravelDriveRace.com

Museums in Gothenburg
Museum
Automobile museums in Sweden
Hisingen